The Pinnacle is a mountain in Frelighsburg, Quebec, Canada.

The Pinnacle was originally inhabited by the Abenaki tribe and is considered one of the few remaining unspoiled mountains in southwestern Quebec.

References

Pinnacle
Landforms of Montérégie
Pinnacle
Brome-Missisquoi Regional County Municipality